Thruxton is a small rural village and civil parish in Herefordshire, England. It is located within the historic area of Archenfield, near the Welsh border and the city of Hereford. The village lies west of the A465 road and just south of the B4348 road between Kingstone and Much Dewchurch.

The parish had a population of 33 in the 2001 UK Census and is grouped with Kingstone to form Kingstone & Thruxton Group Parish Council for administrative purposes.

The parish church, dedicated to St. Bartholomew, is mainly in the Decorated style.

References

External links
 Village website
 Thruxton, GENUKI genealogy web portal
 List of monuments in the parish (most of the sites are on private property and are not open to the public)

Villages in Herefordshire